The Wolf is a 2020 Chinese television series starring Darren Wang, Li Qin, Xiao Zhan, Xin Zhilei, Kuo Shu-yao, and Lin Yo-wei. It was aired on Tencent Video, iQiyi, and Youku on November 19, 2020.

Synopsis  
Ma Zhaixing, the daughter of Kuizhou city governor Ma Ying, met a kind-hearted teenage boy who grew up in the mountain forest. When the teenage boy saved a young wolf, he was implicated in a murder and was hunted down, falling off a cliff. He was adopted as a son by Chu Kui, (the emperor of Yang empire) and given the title of Prince Bo. Eight years later, Prince Bo encountered Ma Zhaixing by chance. He liked the wisdom and bravery of Ma Zhaixing. Ma Zhaixing also found that although Prince Bo was in a high status, he still retains his natural kindness and sense of justice. With the support of Ma Zhaixing, Prince Bo opposed harsh governance, helped civilians, supported justice, and prevented brothers from fighting. After going through many trials and tribulations, the two finally had their own happiness.

Cast

Main 
 Darren Wang as Chu Youwen
Prince Bo, Chu Kui's adoptive son.
 Li Qin as Ma Zhaixing
 Daughter of Kuizhou city governor.
 Xiao Zhan as Ji Chong/Li Ju Yao
 A bounty hunter whose actual identity is the 2nd Prince of Jin.
 Xin Zhilei as Yao Ji
 A killer under Chu Kui who is adept at using poison.
 Kuo Shu-yao as Yelü Baona
 A Khitan princess.
 Lin Yo-wei as Chu Yougui
 The second son of Chu Kui.

Supporting 
 Ding Yongdai as Chu Kui 
 Historical prototype: Zhu Wen
King of Yang kingdom
 Yan Shikui as Ma Ying
 Governor of Kuizhou city
 Zang Hongna as Ma Jing
 Descendant of a general
 Wang Jiayi as Zhu Youzhen
 The fourth son of Chu Kui
 Ma Dongchen as Mo Xiao
 Prince Bo's guard, the leader of the Night Fury.
 Zhang Xin as Wen Yan
 Prince Bo's guard, a warrior of Night Fury.
 Zhao Cuiwei as Hai Die
 A warrior of Night Fury.
 Shi Liang as Li Cunxu
 King of Jin kingdom
 Gong Zhengnan as Li Jiji
 The first son of Li Cunxu.

Soundtrack 
The soundtrack album The Wolf Original Television Series Soundtrack was digitally released on November 22, 2020 at NetEast Music and Migu Music in mainland China. The album was divided into two parts, only "Part 1" needs to be paid, "Part 2" is free listening and free download. On December 24, 2020, the album was officially released worldwide.

Production 
The series was filmed in various locations in China from April to September 2017. They stayed at Shangri-La City in Yunnan and Xiangshan Film and Television Town in Zhejiang.

Notes

References 

2020 Chinese television series debuts
Chinese historical television series
Television series by New Classics Media
Television series by Youhug Media
Television series set in the Five Dynasties and Ten Kingdoms period